A total solar eclipse occurred on Sunday, March 9, 1997. A solar eclipse occurs when the Moon passes between Earth and the Sun, thereby totally or partly obscuring the image of the Sun for a viewer on Earth. A total solar eclipse occurs when the Moon's apparent diameter is larger than the Sun's, blocking all direct sunlight, turning day into darkness. Totality occurs in a narrow path across Earth's surface, with the partial solar eclipse visible over a surrounding region thousands of kilometres wide. Totality was visible in eastern tip of Kazakhstan, northern tip of Xinjiang and Northeastern China, Northern Mongolia and Russia.

Unusual gravity variations 
This solar eclipse is somewhat special in the sense that some unexplained gravity anomalies of about 7  10−8 m/s2  during the solar eclipse were observed. Attempts (e.g., Van Flandern–Yang hypothesis) to explain these anomalies have not been able to reach a definite conclusion.

Images

Related eclipses

Eclipses of 1997 
 A total solar eclipse on March 9.
 A partial lunar eclipse on March 24.
 A partial solar eclipse on September 2.
 A total lunar eclipse on September 16.

Solar eclipses 1997–2000

Saros 120

Metonic series

See also
 Comet Hale-Bopp

References

External links
 solar-eclipse.de: The total solar eclipse of 03/09/1997

Photos:
 In Russia
 http://www.izmiran.ru/info/personalia/molodensky/Eclips97.html
 Solar Corona Shape

1997 03 09
1997 in science
1997 03 09
March 1997 events
1997 in Mongolia
1997 in Russia